Tufail Anjum is a Pakistani politician who had been a Member of the Provincial Assembly of Khyber Pakhtunkhwa, from May 2013 to May 2018 and from August 2018 to January 2023.

Early life and education
He was born on 16 April 1985 in Mardan District.

He has a degree in Bachelor of Business Administration.

Political career

He was elected to the Provincial Assembly of Khyber Pakhtunkhwa as a candidate of Pakistan Tehreek-e-Insaf (PTI) from Constituency PK-29 Mardan-VII in 2013 Pakistani general election. He received 15,986 votes and defeated Abdul Akbar Khan.

He was re-elected to Provincial Assembly of Khyber Pakhtunkhwa as a candidate of PTI from Constituency PK-49 (Mardan-II) in 2018 Pakistani general election.

References

Living people
Khyber Pakhtunkhwa MPAs 2013–2018
1985 births
Pakistan Tehreek-e-Insaf MPAs (Khyber Pakhtunkhwa)
Khyber Pakhtunkhwa MPAs 2018–2023